Rodrigo Senattore (born 28 January 1994) is a Uruguayan tennis player.

Senattore has a career high ATP singles ranking of 1332 achieved on 21 May 2018. He also has a career high ATP doubles ranking of 710 achieved on 17 December 2018.

Senattore has a career-high ITF juniors ranking of 231, achieved on 9 April 2012.

Senattore represented Uruguay at the 2013 and 2014 Davis Cup, where he has a W/L record of 1–2.

Davis Cup

Participations: (1–2)

   indicates the outcome of the Davis Cup match followed by the score, date, place of event, the zonal classification and its phase, and the court surface.

References

External links

1994 births
Living people
Uruguayan male tennis players
Competitors at the 2010 South American Games
Competitors at the 2014 South American Games
Tennis players at the 2015 Pan American Games
Pan American Games competitors for Uruguay